John Dunn Laird, Baron Laird, of Artigarvan (23 April 1944 – 10 July 2018) was a Northern Irish politician, life peer and former chairman of the cross-border Ulster-Scots Agency. In 2013 Laird allegedly offered to lobby for a firm against parliamentary rules. Consequently, he resigned from the Ulster Unionist Party.

Career
Whilst Chairman of the Ulster Young Unionist Council in 1970, Laird became the youngest member of the Parliament of Northern Ireland, after winning the seat of Belfast Saint Anne's in a by-election caused by the death of his father, Dr Norman Laird OBE.

He was expelled from the Ulster Unionist Parliamentary Party in January 1972 when he voted for a Democratic Unionist Party censure motion opposing a ban on certain processions planned for The Twelfth. He topped the poll in Belfast West in the 1973 Northern Ireland Assembly election opposed to the proposals of the former Prime Minister Brian Faulkner. He repeated this feat as an Ulster Unionist candidate in the 1975 Constitutional Convention election.

He established John Laird Public Relations in 1976, which, now called JPR, is Northern Ireland's longest established PR company still in existence.

He was created a life peer on 16 July 1999 as Baron Laird, of Artigarvan in the County of Tyrone.

Laird studied at the Royal Belfast Academical Institution.

Ulster Scots 
A proponent of Ulster Scots as a language, Lord Laird wanted road signs in Irish, English and Ullans on all roads in Ireland, as "parity of esteem" as signed up for under the Good Friday Agreement. Similarly, he said that the Garda Síochána should be renamed to An Garda Síochána/Hannin Polis. Laird served as head of the Ulster-Scots Agency, before resigning in April 2004, in protest at a cut in government funding for the agency.

Lord Laird found himself at the centre of a minor scandal in 2005, when it was revealed that while chairman of the Ulster-Scots agency, Laird had spent in excess of £2500 of public money on taxis between Belfast and Dublin.

House of Lords
Laird sat in the House of Lords as an independent. Laird used parliamentary privilege to speak out against the Irish Republican Army (IRA) in the House of Lords. In May 2005 he claimed that Phil Flynn, an advisor to the Taoiseach, Bertie Ahern, was active in the IRA. In December that year he said that there were 200 IRA "sleepers" in high places in the Republic of Ireland. In November 2007 he again used parliamentary privilege to name senior IRA members who he said were responsible for the murder of south Armagh man Paul Quinn in October.

Investigation into "paid advocacy" and suspension 
In June 2013, following investigations by undercover reporters from the Sunday Times, The Telegraph, and the BBC, in which he was filmed agreeing to arrange for questions to be raised in Parliament in exchange for a monthly retainer of £2,000, Laird relinquished the Ulster Unionist Party whip and referred himself to the House of Lords Commissioner for Standards.

On 18 December 2013, the ruling by the Lords Committee for Privileges and Conduct resulted in a four month suspension House of Lords.

Expenses
Laird claimed parliamentary expenses of £73,000 in 2008/09, making him the most expensive peer in the House of Lords for that parliamentary year.

2007 election: Donegal
In December 2006 Laird announced plans to stand in Donegal North-East and Donegal South-West on what he termed a radical Ulster-Scots ticket. He said he intended to use the publicity platform of his candidacy to highlight what he called the double standards of the Irish Government in relation to the Ulster-Scots movement. However, after suffering a mild heart attack he did not stand.

Publications 
The following is a list of books, plays, and films for which Lord John Laird has been responsible:

 Videos Trolleybus Days in Belfast (1992)
 Swansong of Steam in Ulster (1993)
 Waterloo Sunset (1994)
 Rails on the Isle of Wight (1994)
 The Twilight of Steam in Ulster (1994) 
 A Struggle to be Heard – by a True Ulster Liberal (2010)

Arms

See also
 List of Northern Ireland Members of the House of Lords

References

External links

 Lord Laird Passes Away
 Lord Laird website
 John Laird, Crossbencher Stratagem 
 Ulster's 'Braveheart' on rebel hunt, Interview with the Sunday Tribune, 22 January 2006 (Newshound)
 Debrett's Limited
  Parliamentary answers 2010/11.

1944 births
2018 deaths
Crossbench life peers
Members of the House of Commons of Northern Ireland 1969–1973
Members of the Northern Ireland Assembly 1973–1974
Members of the Northern Ireland Constitutional Convention
People educated at the Royal Belfast Academical Institution
Scots language activists
Ulster Unionist Party members of the House of Commons of Northern Ireland
Male writers from Northern Ireland
21st-century writers from Northern Ireland
Members of the House of Commons of Northern Ireland for Belfast constituencies
Ulster Unionist Party life peers
Life peers created by Elizabeth II